Langrial (لنگڑيال) is one of the union councils of Kharian Tehsil, Gujrat District in the Punjab province of Pakistan. Langrial is situated on both side of Kotla Arab Ali Khan-old Guliyana road, which goes from Kotla Arab Ali Khan to Guliyana. Langrial is 2 km away from Kotla Arab Ali Khan. The town was founded in 1478 by Ratan Langrial who came from Multan.

The headquarters of the Union Council is Langrial, which lies almost midway between Bhimber, Azad Kashmir and Gujrat.The village derives its name from the Langrial tribe of Jats.   Langrial is one of the modern village having all basic / advance facilities including  Government high schools separately for girls and boys, 2 x private schools, bank, post office and number of doctors /physicians providing quality medical treatment. Hygiene conditions are good as it has three water treatment plants for safe drinking water as well as cemented streets .People of the village are friendly in nature which has led to cohesive environment. Cricket ,volley ball and football are favourite 
 and popular sports in the village

Bangial village, Mandhar, Bhandgran, KaluChak, Rathori, Sheikhpur, Syria,
Mathana Chak, FazalChak These Villages of Union Council Langrial. Tribe of Jatt, Rajput, Malik, Sayed, Mughal
Mirza, Some Others Caste

See also 
 Mola Langrial

References

Union councils of Gujrat District
Populated places in Gujrat District